879 Naval Air Squadron (879 NAS) was a Naval Air Squadron of the Royal Navy's Fleet Air Arm that was active during the Second World War. It was formed in 1942, and from 1943 was equipped with Supermarine Seafire fighters, operating mainly in the Mediterranean Sea. It took part in the Allied landings at Salerno, Italy in 1943 and Operation Dragoon, the Allied invasion of southern France. It was disbanded in 1944.

Service
879 Squadron was formed on 1 October 1942 at RNAS St Merryn when it was split from 809 Squadron. It was a carrier-based fighter squadron equipped with Fairey Fulmar two-seat fighters. The squadron moved to Old Sarum Airfield in November that year and carried training on army support operations, before moving to RNAS Stretton in March 1943 for re-equipping with Supermarine Seafire Ib fighters. More army-co-operation training followed at RAF Andover in June, with the squadron re-equipping with new Seafire L.IIcs.

The squadron deployed aboard the escort carrier  in July 1943, forming an all Seafire airwing aboard Attacker with 886 Squadron when the carrier sailed for the Mediterranean on 3 August 1943. In September 1943, Attacker took part in the Allied landings at Salerno, Italy, the carrier's Seafires providing fighter cover for the landings. The squadron flew 75 patrols over the beachhead, claiming one Focke Wulf Fw 190 fighter damaged. After the end of her duties off Salerno, Attacker returned to Britain for refit, with 879 Squadron disembarking. Further training followed, with the squadron strength increasing to 20 Seafires in February 1944.

In April 1944, the squadron again embarked on Attacker, this time as the sole embarked squadron, with the carrier sailing for the Mediterranean in May. When Attacker arrived in the Mediterranean, the squadron was split up, with some detachments at Gibraltar and Blida, and others to Italy where they were attached to squadrons of the Desert Air Force, including 4 Squadron SAAF, carrying out bombing and reconnaissance operations in support of the army. The squadron re-embarked on Attacker at the end of July 1944, and from 15 August took part in Operation Dragoon, the Allied invasion of southern France, providing air cover for the landings, carrying out ground attack and reconnaissance operations, with the squadron having several pilots specially trained in reconnaissance operations attached. The squadron had flown 193 operational missions by the time Attacker withdrew on 23 August.

From 14 September, Attacker took part in Operation Outing, an offensive by the Royal Navy against German forces in the Aegean Sea, with 879 Squadron's Seafires carrying out armed reconnaissance and attack operations, continuing with similar operations over the Aegean through September and October, and covering amphibious landings on Mytilene and Piskopi as the Germans retreated from the Aegean. The squadron disembarked at Dekheila in Egypt in December 1944, not re-embarking on Attacker until April 1945, when the carrier was on passage to Ceylon to join the East Indies Fleet. The squadron flew operations over the Malay Peninsula shortly before VJ-Day, but returned back to Britain on Attacker, disembarking on 10 November 1945 and disbanding at RAF Nutts Corner in Northern Ireland on 7 January 1946.

References

 
 
 
 

800 series Fleet Air Arm squadrons
Military units and formations established in 1942
Military units and formations of the Royal Navy in World War II